Tanguy Banhie-Zoukrou (born 7 May 2003) is a French professional footballer who plays as a centre-back for Troyes.

Career
Zoukrou is a youth product of FO Plaisir and ACBB. He joined Troyes in January 2020. He made his professional debut with Troyes in a 2–1 Ligue 1 loss to Paris Saint-Germain on 7 August 2021.

References

External links
 
 FFF Profile

2003 births
Living people
People from Le Chesnay
French sportspeople of Ivorian descent
French footballers
Association football defenders
France youth international footballers
Ligue 1 players
Championnat National 3 players
ES Troyes AC players